Tochowicz is a Polish surname. Notable people with the surname include:

 Leon Tochowicz (1897–1965), Polish physician and cardiologist
 Stanisław Tochowicz (1923–1994), Polish metallurgist

Polish-language surnames